Elizabeth Seton Academy may refer to:

Elizabeth Seton Academy (Boston) in Boston, Massachusetts
Mother Seton Academy in Baltimore, Maryland
St. Elizabeth Ann Seton Academy in Central Falls, Rhode Island
St. Elizabeth Ann Seton Academy in Milwaukee, Wisconsin
Academy of St. Elizabeth in Convent Station, New Jersey